Honorias was a late Roman province encompassing parts of Bithynia and Paphlagonia in Asia Minor (modern Asian Turkey).
 
Its capital was Claudiopolis (modern Bolu), and its governor held the modest rank of praeses.

History 
The province was established under Theodosius I and named after his younger son Honorius. It formed part of the Diocese of Pontus, bordering with Bithynia in the west, Galatia Prima in the south and Paphlagonia in the east.
 
In the administrative reforms of Emperor Justinian I, the province was united with that of Paphlagonia  and formed a new province of Paphlagonia, under a governor styled praetor Iustinianus.
 
Aside from the capital Claudiopolis, the major cities and episcopal seats of the province listed in the Synecdemus were Prusias and Tium.

References 

Late Roman provinces
Provinces of the Byzantine Empire
Roman Bithynia
Praetorian prefecture of the East
Roman Paphlagonia